The Type 2, T40 mine is a Dutch anti-tank blast mine, specially designed for use on soft ground or wetlands. The mine has a steel case made from two dished plates joined by a watertight seal. The mine is in service with the Royal Netherlands Army.

Specifications
 Diameter: 280 mm
 Height: 90 mm
 Weight: 6 kg 
 Explosive content: 4.08 kg of TNT
 Operating pressure: 45 kg

References
 
 Jane's Mines and Mine Clearance 2005-2006

Anti-tank mines